Steurer is a surname. Notable people with the surname include:

 Florence Steurer (later Penz, born 1949), French alpine skier
 Toni Steurer (born 1978), German ski mountaineer and extreme sports athlete